Johor State Constitution is the state constitution of Johor, promulgated on 14 April 1895 by Sultan Abu Bakar. The contents of the constitution covers many aspects:
 The procedures for the selection and coronation of the Sultan of Johor, as well as the succession procedures
 The laws and responsibilities of the State Assembly, Executive Council (Exco) and their members
 Rules regarding to Islam as the official religion of Johor
 The development of the basics of legal punishments by justice courts
 International deals

Since 1895, the Johor State Establishment Constitution was revised 4 times:-
 First Revision (1 April 1908)
 Second Revision (17 September 1912)
 Third Revision (12 May 1914)
 Fourth Revision (17 July 1918)

Role in Malay nationalism 
Undang-undang Tubuh Negeri Johor is the first written constitution among the Malay states. Undang-undang Tubuh Negeri Johor played a major role for the Malays during their opposition against the formation of Malayan Union. The key factors of their protest were because all Sultans of Malay states would lose their power as the ruler of their respectable states, and the way Sir Harold MacMichael threatened the Sultans for their signatures.

Sultan Ibrahim of Johor himself was encouraged by MacMichael to sign on the treaty, sparking anger among Malays, claiming that signing the Malayan Union treaty violated the Undang-undang Tubuh Negeri Johor which disallowed the Sultan of Johor from performing actions that might threaten the sovereignty of Johor. As a response of the protest, he hosted the first UMNO's first general assembly at his palace in Johor Bahru in May 1946. He also joined the boycott of the installation of Malayan Union's first governor.

Due to the success of the Malayan Union protest by the Malays, rulers of other Malay states began using Undang-undang Tubuh Negeri Johor as a model for their own constitutions in order to protect the sovereignty of Malay states.

References 

 Haji Buyung Adil, "Sejarah Johor", Kuala Lumpur, DBP, 1971 p. 261.
 Fauzi Basri and Hasrom Haron. "Sejarah Johor- Moden 1855-1940: Satu Perbincangan dari Pelbagai Aspek", Kuala Lumpur. Jabatan Muzium Semenanjung Malaysia, 1978, p. 229. 
 Ibid, p. 251 
 Ibid, p. 254

External links
 Official website of the government of Johor
 Hari Ini Dalam Sejarah: Pemasyhuran Undang-undang Tubuh Kerajaan Johor

British Malaya
Johor
Law of Malaysia
Constitution of Malaysia